Jaura, is a town and Union Council in Wazirabad Tehsil, Wazirabad District, Punjab, Pakistan.

See also

 Gujranwala
 Ahmad Nagar

References

Cities and towns in Gujranwala District
Populated places in Wazirabad Tehsil
Union councils of Wazirabad Tehsil